Zhivko Dinev (born 30 July 1987) is a Bulgarian footballer who plays as a central defender for Einherji.

Career
Zhivko Dinev was raised in Sliven's youth teams. In 2005, Dinev agreed to his first professional contract, a five-year deal with Sliven. On 14 August 2005, as an 18-year-old, he made his debut for the first team squad in a match of the B PFG against Nesebar.

Club statistics
As of 1 June 2012

References

External links
Zhivko Dinev at playmakerstats.com (English version of zerozero.pt)

Bulgarian footballers
1987 births
Living people
OFC Sliven 2000 players
PFC Kaliakra Kavarna players
First Professional Football League (Bulgaria) players
Club Valencia players
PFC Nesebar players
Bulgarian expatriate footballers
Expatriate footballers in the Maldives
Sportspeople from Sliven
Association football central defenders
Association football defenders
Zhivko Dinev